Colors of Memory (In Persian: مینای شهر خاموش, transliteration of title: Minā-ye Shahr-e Khāmoush) is a 2008 Iranian film directed by Amir-Shahab Razavian, based on the events of the 2003 Bam earthquake. This film's original name is Minā-ye Shahr-e Khāmoush (مینای شهر خاموش), which may be translated as The Minā of the Silent Town.

Cast

 Ezzatollah Entezami as Mr Ghanāti.
 Shahbāz Noushir as Doctor Pārsā.
 Sāber Abar as Iraj Bahrāmi, the chauffeur.
 Mehran Rajabi as Jebeli.
 Rezā Khamseh as an old man.
 Royā Jāvid'niā as doctor Dāvoudi.
 Mirjā Mahir as assistant to doctor Dāvoudi.

Reception
The film was released at the Tiburon Film Festival on March 14, 2008. The film was praised by Canadian Online Explorer as "both celebratory and heartbreaking" and urged Iranians "to bring tissues."

See also
Bam 6.6

References

External links
Tiburon Film Festival

2008 films
Iranian drama films
Films whose director won the Best Directing Crystal Simorgh